A Midnight Bell is a 1921 American silent comedy film. The film was directed and produced by its star, Charles Ray. His brother, Albert, is thought to have co-directed some scenes. The film is believed to be lost.

The film is based on a play by the same name written by Charles Hale Hoyt that premiered on Broadway in 1889 with Maude Adams in a leading role and starred Eugene Canfield as Martin Tripp.

Director Charles Ray went on to lose his entire fortune in 1923 when he produced The Courtship of Miles Standish, which was a terrible flop at the box office. He later died in 1943 from a severe tooth infection.

Plot summary
Martin Tripp (Charles Ray) is a traveling salesman who turns a struggling small-town store into a successful business. He becomes involved in a mystery involving an old church that is supposed to be haunted. Tripp is challenged to spend a night in the old building. A group of criminals, pretending to manifest supernatural phenomena, are exposed by Tripp in the end.

Cast
Charles Ray as Martin Tripp
Donald MacDonald as Stephen Labaree
Van Dyke Brooke as Abner Grey
Doris Pawn as Annie Grey
Clyde McCoy as Mac
Jess Herring as Spike
S.J. Bingham as 'Bull' Barton
Bert Offord as 'Slick' Sweeney
Monte Collins (bit part, uncredited)

References

External links

1921 films
1921 comedy films
American black-and-white films
Silent American comedy films
American silent feature films
Lost American films
First National Pictures films
1921 lost films
Lost comedy films
Films directed by Charles Ray
1920s American films
1920s English-language films